This is a list of United States national Golden Gloves champions in the featherweight division, along with the state or region they represented.

1928 - George Root - Chicago
1929 - Barney Ross - Chicago
1930 - Benny Goldblatt - Chicago
1931 - Don Gonzales - Cleveland
1932 - Joe Roman - Joliet
1933 - Leo Rodak - Chicago
1934 - Al Nettlow - Detroit
1935 - Andy Scrivani - Chicago
1936 - Ted Kara - Cleveland
1937 - William Joyce - Gary
1938 - Eddie Dempsey - Davenport
1939 - Tony Ancona - Detroit
1940 - Roly Lewis - Muncie
1941 - Jack Haley - Kansas City
1942 - Sam Derrico - Cleveland
1943 - Tony Janiro - Cleveland
1944 - Major Jones - Kansas City
1945 - Virgil Franklin - Oklahoma City
1946 - Jack Dicker - St. Louis
1947 - Eddie Marotta - Cleveland
1948 - Fernando Rivera - Kansas City
1949 - Eugene Robnett - Chicago
1950 - Ples Gilmore - Toledo
1951 - Ken Davis - Los Angeles
1952 - Ken Davis - Los Angeles
1953 - Johnny Butler - Grand Rapids
1954 - Joe Carles - Los Angeles
1955 - Harry Smith - Cedar Rapids
1956 - Leroy Jeffrey - Tulsa
1957 - Brown McGhee - Montgomery
1958 - Fred Morish - Chicago
1959 - Don Eddington - St. Louis
1960 - Nicholas Spanakos - Hollywood
1961 - James Anderson - St. Louis
1962 - George Foster - Cleveland
1963 - Nick Petrecca - Chicago
1964 - Marcus Anderson - Louisville
1965 - Marcus Anderson - Louisville
1966 - Richard Gillis - Kansas City
1967 - Brooks Byrd - Roswell
1968 - Lorenzo Trujillo - Fort Worth
1969 - James Busceme - Fort Worth
1970 - James Busceme - Fort Worth
1971 - Louis Self - Toledo
1972 - Louis Self - Toledo
1973 - Morice Watkins - Fort Worth
1974 - William Berry - Elizabeth
1975 - Ronnie Shields - Fort Worth
1976 - Davie Armstrong - Las Vegas
1977 - Bernard Taylor - Knoxville
1978 - Bernard Taylor - Knoxville
1979 - Roland Cooley - Pennsylvania
1980 - Bernard Taylor - Knoxville
1981 - Rodney Watts - Columbus
1982 - Shelton La Blanc - Lafayette
1983 - Andrew Minsker - Las Vegas
1984 - Victor Levine - Indiana
1985 - Kelcie Banks - Jackson
1986 - William Little - Knoxville
1987 - Donald Stokes - Louisiana
1988 - Stephen Golisano- East Boston
1989 - Oscar De La Hoya - Los Angeles
1990 - Fernando Sepulveda - Nevada
1991 - Fernando Sanchez - Nevada
1992 - Michael Clark (boxer) - West Virginia
1993 - Guillermo Moreno - California
1994 - Augustine Sanchez - Nevada
1995 - Frank Carmona - So. California
1996 - Floyd Mayweather Jr. - Michigan
1997 - José Hernández - Chicago
1998 - Aaron Torres - Pennsylvania
1999 - Michael Evans - Cincinnati
2000 - Rodrick Jones - St. Louis
2001 - Aaron Garcia - California
2002 - Jason Ray - San Diego
2003 - Carney Bowman - Pennsylvania
2004 - Gary Lino - New York Metropolitan Area
2005 - Prenice Brewer - Cleveland
2006 - Sadam Ali - New York metropolitan area
2007 - Hylon Williams - Texas
2008 - Keenan Smith - Philadelphia, PA
2009 - Robert Rodriguez, Colorado/New Mexico

References

Golden Gloves